Vuisile Joba Dliso, known as Job Dliso, is a South African politician and trade unionist who has served as a Member of the North West Provincial Legislature for the African National Congress since May 2019. In June 2019, he was appointed chairperson of the legislature's Standing Committee on Public Accounts.

Political career
Dliso is a member of the African National Congress. He was appointed the provincial secretary of COSATU in January 2016. He succeeded Solly Phetoe, who was elected deputy secretary-general of the federation.

Dliso was nominated to the North West Provincial Legislature after the provincial election that was held on 8 May 2019. He was sworn in as an MPL on 22 May 2019. In June 2019, he was named chairperson of the Standing Committee on Public Accounts.

References

Living people
Year of birth missing (living people)
African National Congress politicians
Members of the North West Provincial Legislature
21st-century South African politicians
Tswana people
South African trade unionists
People from North West (South African province)